The Japan–Korea Treaty of 1910, also known as the Japan–Korea Annexation Treaty, was made by representatives of the Empire of Japan and the Korean Empire on 22 August 1910. In this treaty, Japan formally annexed Korea following the Japan–Korea Treaty of 1905 (by which Korea became a protectorate of Japan) and the Japan–Korea Treaty of 1907 (by which Korea was deprived of the administration of internal affairs).

Japanese commentators predicted that Koreans would easily assimilate into the Japanese Empire.

In 1965, the Treaty of Basic Relations between South Korea and Japan confirmed this treaty is "already null and void".

History
The treaty was proclaimed to the public (and became effective) on 29 August 1910, officially starting the period of Japanese rule in Korea. The treaty had eight articles, the first being: "His Majesty the Emperor of Korea makes the complete and permanent cession to His Majesty the Emperor of Japan of all rights of sovereignty over the whole of Korea".

Gojong of the Korean Empire later called the treaty a neugyak. The alternative term used in lieu of joyak implies the Koreans were coerced into accepting the treaty  by the Japanese. Gyeongsul Gukchi (National humiliation of the year of Gyeongsul)" and Gukchi-il (National humiliation day)" are alternative terms for the year and date the treaty was signed, respectively.

The United Kingdom had already acquiesced to the annexation of Korea by Japan, via the British connection to Imperial Japan via the Anglo-Japanese Alliance of 1902; and the United States had also sanctioned the annexation, as per the Taft-Katsura Agreement.

Japan–Korea Annexation 
The Japanese Empire had already confirmed the policy of Annexation at the Cabinet Meeting on 6 July 1909. However, it was left only to minimize side effects and obtain an international justification. The Japanese imperial government was preparing a scenario for a "merger petition" to Shigemaru Sugiyama, an advisor of the Iljinhoe. Prior to this, Song Byeong-jun went to the Japanese Empire in February 1909 and held a bargaining for the country. Many times, Itō Hirobumi urged a "merger", but when work was delayed due to the Japanese imperial armed forces plan, he went directly to the Japanese Empire and negotiated a "merger" against the Japanese imperial Prime Minister Katsura Tarō and other members of the Japanese imperial Choya.

If Song Byeong-jun's cabinet is established, not only is there a risk of retaliation, but also Ye Wanyong, fearing that the main role of the annexation will be taken away, said, "Even if the current cabinet collapses, a more pro-Japanese cabinet cannot come out." and voluntarily informed the Ministry of Knowledge Economy that it was possible. 

In directing such a scenario, the Japanese Empire gradually decided that the period of “Annexation” was ripening, and promoted Shigemaru to make a “joining petition” using Lee Yong-gu and Song Byeong-jun.

Legality
The legality of the treaty was later disputed by the exiled Provisional Government of the Republic of Korea, as well as the South Korean government. While the treaty was affixed with the national seal of the Korean Empire, Emperor Sunjong of Korea refused to sign the treaty as required under Korean law. The treaty was instead signed by Prime Minister Ye Wanyong of the Korean Empire, and Resident General Count Terauchi Masatake of the Empire of Japan.

This issue caused considerable difficulty in negotiating the establishment of basic diplomatic relations between the countries. Korea insisted on including a chapter stipulating, "The treaty was null and void", although Japanese government did not confirm the illegality. Japanese government insisted the treaty was null and void in 1965. A compromise was reached in language of Article II of the 1965 Treaty on Basic Relations:

"It is confirmed that all treaties or agreements concluded between the Empire of Japan and the Empire of Korea on or before August 22, 1910, are already null and void."

Conference to discuss legality of the treaty 

In January, April, and November 2001, an academic conference on the legality of Japan's annexation of Korea from 1910 to 1945 (titled A reconsideration of Japanese Annexation of Korea from the Historical and International Law Perspectives) was held at Harvard University with the support of the Korea Foundation. Scholars of history and international law participated from South Korea, North Korea, Japan, the United States, the United Kingdom, Germany, and Canada.

Anthony Carty, a professor at the University of Derby, stated, "During the height of the imperialism, it is difficult to find an international law sufficient to determine the legality/illegality of a particular treaty." According to the Asian Yearbook of International Law, in his book on international law, "Carty prefers seeing the relationship between Japan and Korea at the time with reference to the reality of the then international community dominated by Western powers, rather than viewing it in terms of treaty law as argued by Korean scholars".

Alexis Dudden, a professor at the University of Connecticut, discussed Nitobe Inazō's science of colonial policy. She is the author of Japan's Colonization of Korea: Discourse and Power in which she discusses how Japanese policymakers carefully studied and then invoked international law to annex Korea legally.

According to Kan Kimura, a major result of this conference is that the Korean claim that the annexation was illegal was rejected by the participating Western scholars, as well as others specializing in international law.

Activism
On 28 August 2007, regarding the General Power of Attorney by Sunjong, Korean newspaper Dong-a Ilbo reported that Korean monarchs did not sign in the official documents with their real names, traditionally, but the Korean Emperor was forced by Japan to follow a new custom to sign with his real name, which originated from the Western Hemisphere. It mentioned Sunjong's signature may be compulsory.

On 23 June 2010, 75 South Korean congressmen suggested the legal nullification of the Japan–Korea Annexation Treaty to the Prime Minister Naoto Kan.

On 6 July 2010, Korean and Japanese progressive Christian groups gathered in Tokyo's Korean YMCA chapter and jointly declared that the Japan–Korea Annexation Treaty was unjustified.

On 28 July 2010, around 1000 intellectuals in Korea and Japan issued a joint statement that the Japan–Korea Annexation Treaty was never valid in the first place.

See also

 Taft–Katsura Agreement
 Root–Takahira Agreement
 Treaty of Portsmouth
 Anglo–Japanese Alliance
 Unequal treaty
 History of Japan–Korea relations
 Korea under Japanese rule
 List of territories occupied by Imperial Japan

Notes

References

 Korean Mission to the Conference on the Limitation of Armament, Washington, D.C., 1921–1922. (1922). Korea's Appeal to the Conference on Limitation of Armament. Washington: U.S. Government Printing Office. OCLC 12923609
 United States. Dept. of State. (1919). Catalogue of treaties: 1814–1918. Washington: Government Printing Office. OCLC 3830508

External links 

 Japan Korea Annexation Treaty of 1910 from Wikisource
 "The annexation of Korea" (editorial) Japan Times, August 29, 2010
 "Historic declaration by Japanese and Korean intellectuals is a step towards reconciliation" Asia News, May 20, 2010

Korea under Japanese rule
Japan–Korea relations
Treaties involving territorial changes
1910 in Japan
1910 in Korea
Treaties concluded in 1910
Treaties entered into force in 1910
Treaties of the Empire of Japan
Treaties of the Korean Empire
August 1910 events
Bilateral treaties of Japan